James R Ford is a contemporary British conceptual artist.

Work
Ford's work contemplates human needs and wants, the perils of choice, and the value of things and nothings in art and life. The search for, and generation of, meaning is also important to his practice, along with the confusion this can lead to. His focus is on conceptual reductivism, through looped short films, found object assemblage, poignant text statements or minimalist mark making.

"The playfulness of Ford’s work allows him to approach complex philosophical theories and present the audience with an entry point from which to explore existential concerns. There is an urgency in his work yet the folly with which he articulates these urgencies is refreshing. As we try to navigate a way through the milieu of our contemporary condition we feel that Ford, through his practice, might be able to suggest to us a different way of seeing and/or being" (Rudi Christian Ferreira, Curator, 2017)

Ford studied at Nottingham Trent University and Goldsmiths, University of London and currently lives and works in Wellington, New Zealand. Ford has exhibited widely throughout the United Kingdom, New Zealand and internationally, and in 2013 was winner of the inaugural Tui McLauchlan Emerging Artist's Award from the New Zealand Academy of Fine Arts. In 2012 Ford curated a national touring exhibition of contemporary male artists based in New Zealand, entitled Never Mind the Pollocks, featuring creatives including Bill Culbert.

References
If a Tree Falls in the Forest, Who Cares About Philosophy?, July 2016, thecreatorsproject.vice.com
Creative frustration inspires award-winning art, February 2013, stuff.co.nz
An artful pick and mix, January 2012, stuff.co.nz
Keeping fit is child's play, February, 2003, bbc.co.uk

External links

House Gymnastics

Alumni of Nottingham Trent University
British installation artists
1980 births
Living people
Alumni of Goldsmiths, University of London
British contemporary artists